Tolland is a village and civil parish in Somerset, England, situated  north west of Taunton, between the Brendon Hills and Quantock Hills, in the Somerset West and Taunton district.  The parish has a population of 81.

History
The parish of Tolland was part of the Taunton Deane Hundred.

Tolland County in Connecticut, USA is named after the village. The connection was Henry Wolcott who emigrated to America and founded a prominent family which included Oliver Wolcott who signed the United States Declaration of Independence.

Governance
The parish council has responsibility for local issues, including setting an annual precept (local rate) to cover the council’s operating costs and producing annual accounts for public scrutiny. The parish council evaluates local planning applications and works with the local police, district council officers, and neighbourhood watch groups on matters of crime, security, and traffic. The parish council's role also includes initiating projects for the maintenance and repair of parish facilities, as well as consulting with the district council on the maintenance, repair, and improvement of highways, drainage, footpaths, public transport, and street cleaning. Conservation matters (including trees and listed buildings) and environmental issues are also the responsibility of the council.

The village falls within the non-metropolitan district of Somerset West and Taunton, which was established on 1 April 2019. It was previously in the district of Taunton Deane, which was formed on 1 April 1974 under the Local Government Act 1972, and part of Taunton Rural District before that. The district council is responsible for local planning and building control, local roads, council housing, environmental health, markets and fairs, refuse collection and recycling, cemeteries and crematoria, leisure services, parks, and tourism.

Somerset County Council is responsible for running the largest and most expensive local services such as education, social services, libraries, main roads, public transport, policing and  fire services, trading standards, waste disposal and strategic planning.

It is also part of the Taunton Deane county constituency represented in the House of Commons of the Parliament of the United Kingdom. It elects one Member of Parliament (MP) by the first past the post system of election.

Landmarks
Gaulden Manor to the southeast was built in the 16th century and has been designated as a Grade II* listed building, also the 13th century church set in the woods at the south end of the village.

Religious sites
The Church of St John the Baptist was built in the 13th century and remodelled in 1871. The church was given to the Knights Hospitaller to support Buckland Priory, Durston in 1180. After the dissolution of the monasteries in 1539 the property was held by the crown.

References

External links

Villages in Taunton Deane
Civil parishes in Somerset